"Fall Down" is a song by alternative rock band Toad the Wet Sprocket from their fourth studio album, Dulcinea (1994). "Fall Down" was co-written by Glen Phillips and Todd Nichols. Released to US radio in April 1994, the song topped the Billboard Modern Rock Tracks chart and peaked at number 33 on the Billboard Hot 100. In Canada, the song peaked at number 10 and ended 1994 as the country's 76th-most-successful single. The music video for the song was directed by Samuel Bayer. 

In 2017, Consequence ranked the song No. 245 on their list of "Every Alternative Rock No. 1 Hit from Worst to Best".

Background

Singer Glen Phillips said,

Chart performance
"Fall Down" reached number one on the Billboard Modern Rock Tracks chart in June 1994 and remained there for six weeks before being supplanted by the Offspring's "Come Out and Play" in July. It also reached the top five of the Mainstream Rock Tracks chart, peaking at number five, and was a top-40 Billboard Hot 100 hit, reaching number 33.

Track listings
US CD, 7-inch, and cassette single
 "Fall Down" – 3:23
 "All Right" – 5:46

UK CD single
 "Fall Down" – 3:23
 "One Little Girl" – 3:23
 "Come Back Down" – 3:16
 "Nightingale Song" (live) – 2:18

European CD single
 "Fall Down" – 3:23
 "One Little Girl" – 3:23

Charts

Weekly charts

Year-end charts

Release history

References

1994 songs
1994 singles
Columbia Records singles
Music videos directed by Samuel Bayer
Songs written by Glen Phillips (singer)
Songs written by Todd Nichols (musician)
Toad the Wet Sprocket songs